Encephalartos hirsutus is a species of cycad that is native to Limpopo Province, South Africa.

Description
The seeds are coarsely ovoid, long, covered with an orange-red sarcotesta.

Gallery

References

External links
 
 

hirsutus
Endemic flora of South Africa
Flora of the Northern Provinces
Trees of South Africa
Plants described in 1996
Critically endangered flora of Africa